Saqdar (also Romanized as Sāqdar and Sagdar) is a village in Shakhenat Rural District, in the Central District of Birjand County, South Khorasan Province, Iran. At the 2006 census, its population was 181, in 75 families.

References 

Populated places in Birjand County